Prairie View USD 362 is a public unified school district headquartered in La Cygne, Kansas, United States.  The district includes the communities of La Cygne, Cadmus, Centerville, Fontana, Linn Valley, Parker, and nearby rural areas.

Schools
The school district operates the following schools:
 Prairie View High School, in La Cygne
 Prairie View Middle School, in La Cygne
 La Cygne Elementary, in La Cygne
 Parker Elementary, in Parker
 Fontana Elementary, in Fontana  Consolidated with Parker Elementary in 2014

Sports
Prairie View High School sports include baseball, boys' and girls' basketball, cross country, cheer and football, softball, track, volleyball and wrestling.

See also
 List of unified school districts in Kansas
 List of high schools in Kansas
 Kansas State Department of Education
 Kansas State High School Activities Association

References

External links
 

School districts in Kansas